Reintegration Time is the second album from Canadian alternative dance band Shout Out Out Out Out, released in Canada on March 3, 2009 and in the United States on May 5, 2009, on Nrmls Wlcm Records.

The album's first single, "In the End It's Your Friends" was released in 2008 on a 12" single split with American electronic artist San Serac.

Tracks from the album were featured in the video game Mass Effect 3, as background music in Commander Shepard's personal cabin.

Track listing
 "Run"
 "Guilt Trips Sink Ships"
 "Bad Choices"
 "Coming Home" (feat. Cadence Weapon)
 "How Do I Maintain Pt. 1"
 "How Do I Maintain Pt. 2"
 "One Plus Two Plus Three"
 "Remind Me in Dark Times"
 "In the End It's Your Friends"
 "Reintegration Time"

References

2009 albums
Shout Out Out Out Out albums